Noel Cobb  (21 March 1938 in Grand Rapids, Michigan, USA – 2 January 2015, England)

Philosopher, psychologist and author Noel Cobb lived and studied in Norway from 1959 to 1966 and made many friends there. Among them Axel Jensen, Jan Erik Vold and August Lange.

He published numerous books of poetry and non-fiction. He worked with R. D. Laing, studied various forms of meditation, became a Jungian analyst, and founded a charitable trust, "The London Convivium for Archetypal Studies". He is the author of "Prospero's Island: The Secret Alchemy at the Heart of The Tempest".

In Oslo, he was integrated into a radical cultural environment and took a degree in psychology. However, he was expelled from Norway because of his experimentation with marihuana — this despite his having fathered a child there. After returning to England he worked as general manager at R. D. Laing experimental clinic for schizophrenics in London, where Axel Jensen also stayed one year. Later he studied Tibetan language, Buddhism, therapy and meditation in India and Nepal. In 1981 he opened a private practice as a psychotherapist in England.
From 1987 he led "The London Convivium for Archetypal Studies". Noel started the yearbook "Sphinx: A Journal of Archetypal Psychology and the Arts", where he published many articles.

Bibliography 
 1984, Prospero's Island – the Secret Alchemy at the Heart of the Tempest, (Coventure, London)
 1992, Archetypal Imagination – Glimpses of the Gods in Life and Art, (Lindisfarne Press, Hudson, New York)
 1994, Kunsten og Sjelen, (Aschehoug Forlag, Oslo, Norway) – Translation of A, I. Into Norwegian
 1997, Sofferanza e Belleza, (Milan, Moretti & Vitali) – Edited for Eva Loewe
 1998, Maestri di Anima, (Milan, Moretti & Vitali)

References

1938 births
2015 deaths
Writers from Grand Rapids, Michigan
American male poets
20th-century American poets
21st-century American poets
American psychotherapists
University of Oslo alumni
American expatriates in Norway
American expatriates in England
People deported from Norway
20th-century American male writers
21st-century American male writers
20th-century American non-fiction writers
21st-century American non-fiction writers
American male non-fiction writers